HD 100655 is a star in the zodiac constellation of Leo, located 449 light years away from the Sun. It has an apparent visual magnitude of +6.45, which makes it a challenge to see with the naked eye under ideal viewing conditions. The star is moving closer to the Earth with a heliocentric radial velocity of −5 km/s. It has one confirmed planet.

The star HD 100655 is named Formosa. The name was selected in the NameExoWorlds campaign by Taiwan, during the 100th anniversary of the IAU. Formosa is the historical name of Taiwan used in the 17th century, meaning beautiful in Portuguese. The planet HD 100655 b is named Sazum, after the township Yuchi and it means water in the language of the Thao people.

This is an evolved giant star with a stellar classification of G9 III. It is a red clump giant, which means it is currently on the horizontal branch and is generating energy through helium fusion at its core. This star is around 900 million years old with 2.2 times the mass of the Sun and has expanded to 8.8 times the Sun's radius. It is radiating 4,918 times the Sun's luminosity from its enlarged photosphere at an effective temperature of 4,918 K.

Planetary system
The planetary companion, announced in 2011, was discovered by a Korean–Japanese planet search program by the radial velocity method. The motions of the host star displayed Keplerian variation, indicating a perturbing body in orbit. This is one of the two least massive planets known around clump giants, as of 2012.

References

G-type giants
Horizontal-branch stars
Leo (constellation)
100655
BD+21 2331
056508
4459
J11350375+2026295
Planetary systems with one confirmed planet